This is a list of North Dakota State Bison football players in the NFL Draft.

Key

Selections

References

North Dakota State

North Dakota State Bison NFL Draft